Aglaia sapindina is a species of plant in the family Meliaceae. It is found in Australia (Northern Territory and Queensland), Indonesia, Papua New Guinea, and the Solomon Islands.

References

sapindina
Sapindales of Australia
Trees of Malesia
Trees of Papuasia
Least concern flora of Australia
Flora of the Northern Territory
Flora of Queensland
Least concern biota of Queensland
Taxonomy articles created by Polbot
Taxa named by Ferdinand von Mueller